We Need a Little Christmas is the fourth Christmas album, and eighth album overall, by the American acappella group Pentatonix. It was released on November 13, 2020, by RCA Records.

Overview 
We Need a Little Christmas was recorded in each of the group member's houses individually in isolation during the COVID-19 pandemic. It features mostly cover songs, plus the original "Thank You", which was written on group member Scott Hoying's birthday. A music video was released on the group's YouTube channel on November 25, 2020. The first single from the album was "Amazing Grace (My Chains Are Gone)", which was released on November 5, 2020.

Track listing

Personnel 
Pentatonix
 Scott Hoyingbaritone lead and backing vocals, piano on "Thank You"
 Mitch Grassitenor lead and backing vocals
 Kirstin Maldonado alto lead and backing vocals
 Matt Sallee vocal bass, bass lead and backing vocals
 Kevin Olusolavocal percussion, tenor backing vocals, lead vocals on “12 Days of Christmas” and “Amazing Grace”, cello on "Thank You", vocal flugelhorn on "Rudolph The Red-Nosed Reindeer"

Others
 Ben Bram – producer, recording engineer
 Mick Wordley – producer
 Voctave – choir on "Once Upon a December"
 Bing Crosby – guest lead vocals on "White Christmas"
 London Symphony Orchestra – various instruments on "White Christmas"

Charts

References 

2020 Christmas albums
Pentatonix albums
RCA Records albums